HIF may refer to:

Sports clubs 
 Habo IF, in Sweden
 Hammarby IF, in Stockholm, Sweden
 Hässleholms IF, in Sweden
 Helsingborgs IF, in Sweden
 Hemmingsmarks IF, in Sweden
 Hörvikens IF, in Sölvesborg, Sweden
 Hvidovre IF, in Denmark

Other uses 
 Fiji Hindi (ISO 693-3 language code)
 Finnmark University College, now part of the University of Tromsø
 Harrogate International Festivals 
 Health Impact Fund, a proposal of incentives for global health
 Health Insurance Fund, an Australian insurer
 Hill Air Force Base, in Utah, United States
 Horizontal Integration Facility
 Hypoxia-inducible factor
 USGS Hydrologic Instrumentation Facility, of the United States Geological Survey